Alan Michael (born 1967 in Paisley, Scotland) is an artist based in Glasgow.

Michael has exhibited internationally in shows including the 1999 Liverpool Biennial, Put Out More Flags at Sutton Lane in London, Record Collection at Forde Gallery in Geneva, Panache at Els Hanappe Underground in Athens and Kapernekas at Fine Art Inc. in New York. Alan Michael is currently represented by High Art in Paris, and Jan Kaps, in Cologne.

External links
Alan Michael – Saatchi Gallery
Alan Michael – Marc Jancou Contemporary
Alan Michael – Sorcha Dallas
Alan Michael – Hotel Gallery

1967 births
Living people
Artists from Paisley, Renfrewshire